Ana Alcázar (born 8 June 1979) is a former Spanish female tennis player.

She has won six singles titles ITF career. On 8 June 1998, she reached her best singles ranking of world number 119. On 16 February 1998, she peaked at world number 252 in the doubles rankings.

ITF finals

Singles finals (6–2)

Doubles finals (0–2)

External links 
 
 

1979 births
Living people
Spanish female tennis players
Mediterranean Games bronze medalists for Spain
Mediterranean Games medalists in tennis
Competitors at the 1997 Mediterranean Games
20th-century Spanish women